The second season of High School DxD, titled  was produced by TNK and directed by Tetsuya Yanagisawa.

The season ran from July 7 to September 22, 2013, and was released on DVD and Blu-Ray in six compilations by Media Factory from September 25, 2013, to February 26, 2014. In North America, the anime series is licensed by Funimation for simulcast on their website and home video releases on DVD and Blu-ray. The series is licensed by Madman Entertainment in Australia. Funimation released English dub of the second season on November 11, 2014.

Four pieces of theme music are used: two opening and two closing themes. The opening theme for the first arc of the second season is titled "Sympathy" and performed by Larval Stage Planning. The opening theme for the second arc of the second season is titled  and performed by Zaq. The closing theme for the second arc of the second season is titled  and performed by the Occult Research Club Girls, which also features Risa Taneda and Ayane Sakura as their characters Xenovia and Gasper.


Episode list

References

External links
  
  at FUNimation
 

High School DxD episode lists
2013 Japanese television seasons